Lakhon Hain Yahan Dilwale (Hindi: लाखों हैं यहाँ दिलवाले English: Here are millions hearted) is an Indian 2015 romantic film directed and produced by Munnawar Bhagat under the Meera Shamim Films banner. The film was released on 4 September 2015

Cast
Vije Bhatia
Krutika Gaekwad
Aditya Pancholi
Arun Bakshi
Anju Mahendroo
Kishori Shahane

Plot
The story of the film is about a young man named Arsh (Vije Bhatia) whose passion is singing and whose love are the songs from the era of 60s. To fulfill his dreams, he comes to Mumbai.

Reception
The film did not got good response from the audiences. Rahul Desai of Catch News said "Lakhon Hain Yahan Dilwale drowns in its bubble of timelessness."

References

External links
 
 

2010s Hindi-language films
2015 films
Indian drama films
Films shot in Mumbai
2015 drama films
Hindi-language drama films